Free Hands is the name of Emmett Chapman's two-handed tapping method of parallel hands used on his Chapman Stick instrument, and on several other Stick-inspired instruments.  Chapman first published his tapping lessons in book form in 1976, and called his method book Free Hands: A New Discipline of Fingers on Strings.

Chapman's method of tapping was the first to facilitate equal access to the strings by aligning the right hand's fingers parallel to the frets, the same orientation as the left hand's, but coming from over the neck instead of under.

Guitarists
Notable guitarists that frequently utilize Free Hands or a similar technique include:
Enver İzmaylov
Andy McKee
Zack Kim
Stanley Jordan
Adam Fulara
T.J. Helmerich
Dominic Frasca
I Wayan Balawan
Buckethead
Michael Angelo Batio
Chris Broderick
Michael Hedges
Phil Keaggy
Pierre Bensusan
Pat Metheny

External links
Evolution of a Musical Art
Free Hands Method
 (patent)

Guitar performance techniques